George Alfred Hall Jr. (born August 2, 1984) is a former American football linebacker who played for the Columbus Destroyers of the Arena Football League. He previously signed with the Minnesota Vikings of the National Football League (NFL), but was released without playing a game.

Early years

Hall committed to Purdue University on October 5, 2001. Hall wasn't heavily recruited as he didn't receive any other FBS scholarship offers.

College years
He played college football at Purdue.

See also
 List of Arena Football League and National Football League players

References

American football linebackers
Minnesota Vikings players
Columbus Destroyers players
Living people
Purdue Boilermakers football players
1984 births